Morrell is a Canadian rural community in Victoria County, New Brunswick. Although sometimes called Morrell Siding, Morrell is the official name.

History

Notable people

See also
List of communities in New Brunswick

References
 

Communities in Victoria County, New Brunswick